The Men's 4 × 400 metres relay at the 2018 European Athletics Championships took place at the Olympic Stadium on 10 and 11 August.

Records

Schedule

Results

Round 1
First 3 in each heat (Q) and 2 best performers (q) advance to the Final.

Final

References

4 x 400 metres relay M